Deepa Gahlot is a theater and film critic, book author, and scriptwriter. She has written several books on cinema, translated several plays (by Manav Kaul and Paresh Mokashi) into English and adapted Paulo Coelho's novel The Alchemist for the stage. Additionally, she has written-directed a few documentary films and radio shows, and has edited the journals of NFDC and WICA. In 2002, she served on the Mumbai International Film Festival (MIFF) jury. She is  the head of programming (theatre and film) at the National Center for the Performing Arts (NCPA).

Books

Co-authored
 Bollywood Popular Indian Cinema
 Behind the Scenes of Hindi Cinema: A Visual Journey Through the Heart of Bollywood
 Janani
 Bollywood’s Top 20: Superstars of Indian Cinema
 The Prithviwallahs (co-authored with Shashi Kapoor)

Author
 Take-2: 50 Films that Deserve a New Audience
 King Khan
 Shammi Kapoor (The Legends of Indian Cinema)
 Sheroes: 25 Daring Women of Bollywood Paperback

Award
 National Film Award for Best Film Critic (1998)

See also
Film Critics Circle of India

References

External links

Year of birth missing (living people)
Living people
Indian women translators
Indian film critics
Indian women critics
20th-century Indian translators
20th-century Indian biographers
Indian women non-fiction writers
Women biographers
20th-century women writers
Indian women columnists
Best Critic National Film Award winners
Indian women novelists
20th-century Indian women